The Nechako River  arises on the Nechako Plateau east of the Kitimat Ranges of the Coast Mountains of British Columbia, Canada, and flows north toward Fort Fraser, then east to Prince George where it enters the Fraser River. "Nechako" is an anglicization of netʃa koh, its name in the indigenous Carrier language which means "big river".

Other tributaries include the Cheslatta River, which drains Cheslatta Lake and enters the Nechako at the foot of the Nechako Canyon via Cheslatta Falls, near Kenney Dam and the Nechako Reservoir.

History
The expedition of Alexander MacKenzie went past the mouth of the Nechako in 1793, curiously without observing it. The first European to ascend the Nechako was James McDougall, a member of Simon Fraser's expedition, in 1806.

Nechako Reservoir
The main reservoir of the Nechako power diversion is called the Nechako Reservoir or Ootsa Lake Reservoir, but there are many subnames for different parts of the lake because its conversion into a reservoir involved the amalgamation of chains of lakes, the largest of which were Eutsuk Lake and Natalkuz Lake, which form the south arm of the reservoir. The reservoir's alternate name comes from Ootsa Lake, now merged into the north arm of the reservoir but originally flowing into the Oosta River, a tributary of the Nechako. Other lakes also merged into the north arm are Whitesail Lake and Tahtsa Lake, with the correspondingly-named rivers connecting them now flooded and renamed Whitesail Reach and Tahtsa Reach. The Quanchus Range is located between the two arms of the reservoir.

The damming of the Nechako in 1952 and the consequent massive reduction in flow has been the source of considerable political controversy. The Cheslatta Carrier Nation, a subgroup of the Dakelh or Carrier people, were flooded out by the creation of the reservoir and forced to abandon their homes with only two weeks' warning. The increase in water temperature caused by the reduction in flow has been an ongoing problem for the salmon run on the Fraser and Stuart Rivers as well as the Nechako. Populations of White Sturgeon may have also been affected as studies show an unnatural decline in late-juvenile/early adult populations of the species.

See also
List of tributaries of the Fraser River
List of British Columbia rivers

References

Further reading
Christensen, Bev (1995) Too Good to be True. Vancouver: Talonbooks. (A history of the Kemano project, which dammed the Nechako.)
Giesbrecht, Jean Clark (1994) Heritage Lost: A People's History of the Ootsa Lake Region 1905-1955. Likely, BC: Quesnel Lake Publishing. (Contains an account of the flooding caused by the construction of the Kemano Project.)

External links
 BC Lakes and Rivers
  "Engineers Invade Another Wilderness - Huge Canadian Power Project Marks 20th Century Frontier Boom" , by Richard Neuberger detailed 1951 Popular Science article on the Kemano Hydro Project

Nechako Country
Regional District of Bulkley-Nechako
Rivers of British Columbia
Tributaries of the Fraser River
Cariboo Land District